Vicente Docavo (born 13 February 1992) is a retired Spanish triple jumper.

He finished tenth at the 2013 European U23 Championships. He also competed at the 2010 World Junior Championships, the 2011 European Indoor Championships, the 2012 European Championships and the 2013 European Indoor Championships without reaching the final.

His personal best jump is 16.72 metres, achieved in June 2012 in Huelva. This was also a new meet record for the Meeting Iberoamericano de Atletismo.

International competitions

References

External links
 

1992 births
Living people
Spanish male triple jumpers